Bennetts Corner may refer to
 Bennetts Corner, Pennsylvania
 Bennetts Corners, New York
 Bennetts Corners, Ohio